Gilfillin Lake is a lake in Blue Earth County, Minnesota, in the United States.

Gilfillin Lake was named for Joseph Gilfillin, an early settler who was killed in the Civil War.

References

Lakes of Minnesota
Lakes of Blue Earth County, Minnesota